Koduku Diddina Kapuram is a 1989 Telugu-language action drama film, produced and directed by Krishna under his Padmalaya Studios banner. It stars Krishna, Vijayashanti, Mahesh Babu  and music composed by Raj–Koti. Mahesh Babu played a dual role for his first time as a child artist in this film.

Plot
The story revolves around a couple, Chakravarthy (Krishna) & Sasirekha (Vijayashanti) who are separated due to the evil deed of a cruel person Chakradhar (Mohan Babu) and share their twin sons Pramod & Vinod (both Mahesh Babu). Rest of the story is how the children unite their parents.

Cast

Krishna as Chakravarthy
Vijayashanti as Sasirekha
Mahesh Babu as Vinod & Pramod (dual role)
Mohan Babu as Chakardhar
Gummadi as Pattabhi Rama Rao 
Prabhakar Reddy as Gopala Krishnaiah Master 
Giri Babu as Kondaiah
Pradeep Shakti as  David
Thyagaraju as Srikakuleswara Rao 
Sarathi as Changaiah 
Aswini as Geetha
Sathyapriya as Parvathi 
Jayamalini as Parimalam
Kuyili as item number
Master Satish

Soundtrack

Music composed by Raj–Koti. Lyrics were written by Veturi. Music released on LEO Audio Company.

References

Indian action drama films
Films scored by Raj–Koti
1980s action drama films
1980s Telugu-language films